Ismaeel Ryan (or Ismail Raiyan, ; born 4 April 1994) is an Israeli professional footballer who plays as a attacking midfielder for Hapoel Ramat Gan.

Early life 
Ryan was born in Kabul, Israel, to a Muslim-Arab family.

Club career 
In February 2014, he was loaned from Maccabi Haifa to Hapoel Acre until the end of the season.

On 7 August 2014 he was loaned to Bnei Sakhnin.

Honours

Club
Maccabi Haifa
Israel State Cup (1): 2015–16

References

External links
 
 

1994 births
Living people
Israeli footballers
Arab-Israeli footballers
Arab citizens of Israel
Maccabi Haifa F.C. players
Hapoel Acre F.C. players
Bnei Sakhnin F.C. players
Hapoel Ironi Kiryat Shmona F.C. players
Adanaspor footballers
Sektzia Ness Ziona F.C. players
Hapoel Umm al-Fahm F.C. players
Hapoel Ramat Gan F.C. players
Israeli Premier League players
TFF First League players
Liga Leumit players
Expatriate footballers in Turkey
Israeli expatriate sportspeople in Turkey
Association football midfielders
Footballers from Kabul, Israel
Israel under-21 international footballers
Israeli Muslims